Malcolm Baldrige may refer to:

Howard M. Baldrige (1894–1985), Congressman from Nebraska
Malcolm Baldrige, Jr. (1922–1987), United States Secretary of Commerce
NOAAS Researcher (R 103), renamed the NOAAS Malcolm Baldrige (R 103) as a ship of the National Oceanic and Atmospheric Association
The Malcolm Baldrige National Quality Award, named after Malcolm Baldrige, Jr